is a passenger railway station located in the town of Ishii, Myōzai District,  Tokushima Prefecture, Japan. It is operated by JR Shikoku and has the station number "B06".

Lines
Only local trains stop at the station.

Layout
The station, which is unstaffed, consists of a side platform serving a single track. There is no station building, only a shelter on the platform for waiting passengers. A ramp leads up to the platform from the access road. There is a designated parking area for bicycles near the station.

Adjacent stations

History
Shimoura Station was opened on 20 September 1934 by Japanese Government Railways (JGR) on the then Tokushima Main Line. On 10 August 1941 the station was closed. It was reopened on 1 November 1957. With the privatization of Japanese National Railways (JNR), the successor of JGR, on 1 April 1987, the station came under the control of JR Shikoku. On 1 June 1988, the line was renamed the Tokushima Line.

Surrounding area
Ishii Municipal Takaura Junior High School
Ishii Municipal Urasho Elementary School

See also
 List of Railway Stations in Japan

References

External links

 JR Shikoku timetable

Railway stations in Japan opened in 1934
Railway stations in Tokushima Prefecture
Ishii, Tokushima